Piz di Sassiglion (2,855 m) is a mountain of the Livigno Alps, located on the border between Switzerland and Italy. It is the highest summit of the chain south of the Passo di Malghera. The mountain lies east of Poschiavo (Graubünden) and west of the Val Grosina (Lombardy).

References

External links
 Piz di Sassiglion on Hikr

Mountains of the Alps
Mountains of Graubünden
Mountains of Lombardy
Mountains of Switzerland
Poschiavo